Sivakarthikeyan (born 17 February 1985), also referred to as SK is an Indian actor, singer, film producer, lyricist, and television presenter, who works predominantly in Tamil films.

He produces films under his production company, Sivakarthikeyan Productions.

Personal life
Sivakarthikeyan married Aarthi on 27 August 2010. The couple have two children: a daughter Aradhana born in October 2013, and a son Gugan Doss born in July 2021. Aradhana sang a song alongside her father titled "Vayadi Petha Pulla" from the film Kanaa.

Career

2007–2012: Television and shift to cinema
During college, Sivakarthikeyan took part in various cultural events and performed mimicry and stand-up comedy on stage. Between his studies he took three months break and during this period his friends convinced him to go for auditions of Kalakka Povathu Yaaru, a reality show for comedy aired on Star Vijay. He started his career as a mimicry artist. Despite initial reluctance to participate, he won the show.  He appeared in short films including his friend Atlee's Mugapputhagam, Identity, Kurahl 786 and 360°. The makers of Aegan noticed Sivakarthikeyan and offered him a supporting role, but his portions didn't make the final cut.

Director Pandiraj approached him to play the lead role in his film Marina and Sivakarthikeyan signed the project. He prepared for his first role by paying close attention to Pandiraj's instructions and visiting Marina Beach extensively to study the surroundings, while revealing that he hoped that his natural talent of humour would come through on-screen. Featuring alongside Oviya as a young couple in the film, Siva's performance was well received with a critic noting "the romance adds color to a monochrome film", while the reviewer also noted that the "role of Senthilnathan requires Siva to be just himself, it is just a cake walk in terms of performance for this actor."

Prior to Marinas release, Aishwarya Dhanush had signed him up to play a supporting role as Dhanush's friend in 3, after being impressed with his work on stage as a host. Following significant pre-release hype, the film opened to predominantly positive reviews with critics appreciating Sivakarthikeyan's work providing comic relief in a serious film. The project also marked the beginning of an association with Dhanush, whom Sivakarthikeyan has often stated is his mentor in the film industry. He was next seen in Ezhil's romantic comedy Manam Kothi Paravai, which opened to mixed reviews but had a decent run at the box office.

A critic noted that the film "might not provide Sivakarthikeyan the platform he is aspiring for – lead roles in movies. But it does showcase his potential as an actor."

2013–2019: Experimentation in genres and success
In 2013, he appeared in three films. In his first release of the year, Kedi Billa Killadi Ranga, a dual hero coming-of-age comedy, Sivakarthikeyan partnered once again with Pandiraj and shot for the film in his hometown of Tiruchirappalli alongside Vimal. The film opened to positive reviews with critics. The film became a surprise success at the box office and ended up being a profitable venture for producers and distributors. His next success was through Dhanush's debut production venture Ethir Neechal, written and directed by R. S. Durai Senthilkumar, a former assistant of film director, Vetrimaaran.  It is a story about a young man having talent as a runner, who strives to make an identity for himself. His third release in 2013, director Ponram's comedy Varuthapadatha Valibar Sangam, saw him portray a carefree rural youth where he paired up with another newcomer Sri Divya. Actor Soori played an important role in the film as Sivakarthikeyan's close friend. It was also the first time that Sivakarthikeyan sang a song in a film and a promotional video of its making was released to market the film. He won positive reviews for his performance from critics, with Sify noting "Sivakarthikeyan is terrific as Bosepandi because he makes it look so believable on screen with his body language, eyes and dialogue delivery". Another reviewer called him a delight to watch and claimed that he carried the script. The film completed 100 days during its theatrical run and is Sivakarthikeyan's biggest commercial box office success to date. Sivakarthikeyan's entertaining performances in 2013 has led him to win the year's Vijay Award for Entertainer of the Year, an on-stage moment which Sivakarthikeyan described as "memorable". He started the year 2014 with a comedy film Maan Karate produced by AR Murugadoss. The film featured him as a carefree urban youth who fakes himself as a boxer to impress a girl.

In 2015, Sivakarthikeyan paired up once again with his Ethir Neechal director, Durai Senthilkumar, for a cop action film, Kaaki Sattai. The film released on 27 February 2015. It was a story about a sincere constable who takes risks to stop black market organ donation and having the aim to become an Inspector.  He again joined hands with his Varuthapadatha Valibar Sangam director in the film Rajini Murugan where another newcomer Keerthy Suresh acted. The film's producer, N. Linguswamy, ultimately failed to provide Sivakarthikeyan with his salary due to losses incurred by the film's delayed release. His film Remo, directed by debutant Bakkiyaraj Kannan and produced by R. D. Raja, featured Sivakarthikeyan playing a love-struck youth disguising himself as a female nurse to befriend his love interest. Sivakarthikeyan's next venture was director Mohan Raja's action-thriller, Velaikkaran, pairing with Nayanthara and featuring Fahadh Faasil as the main antagonist. The film, which revolves around an employee fighting against food adulteration in society, was released on 22 December 2017 to positive reviews from critics. He then featured in Seemaraja, directed by Ponram. The film, featuring an ensemble cast including Samantha Ruth Prabhu, Simran, Lal and Soori, released on 13 September 2018, coinciding with the festival of Ganesh Chaturthi, received mixed reviews. His next venture, Kanaa, in Arunraja Kamaraj's directorial debut, featured Sivakarthikeyan as a cricket coach along with Aishwarya Rajesh and Sathyaraj. The film was released on 21 December 2018. It was the debut movie of SK productions. Sivakarthikeyan's next venture was the film, Mr. Local, starring opposite Nayanthara for the second time, which received poor reviews. His scenes from Kanaa were reused in the Telugu remake of the film titled  Kousalya Krishnamurthy. In 2019, Sivakarthikeyan appeared in the family drama film Namma Veettu Pillai, and in a super hero film Hero.

2021–present: Career expansion 
His next film, Doctor, was released on 9 October 2021 and received highly positive reviews from the critics and audience. It became Sivakarthikeyan's career's highest-grossing movie, with a global cume of 100 crores. This is his first movie to join the 100 crore club. His next release was Don, which released on 13 May 2022. Like Doctor, it received favorable reviews by both the critics and audience. It also went on to collect 100 crores at the global box office, becoming his second consecutive 100 crore hit. In February 2022, he began filming for a film under the direction of Anudeep KV, of Jathi Ratnalu, fame titled Prince. At the same time he also began shooting for another film titled Maaveeran which is directed by Madonne Ashwin of Mandela fame.

Filmography

Films

As an actor
All films are in Tamil unless otherwise noted.

As a producer

As dubbing artist

Television

Discography

As playback singer

As lyricist

Awards and nominations

Edison Awards 
 2013 Edison Awards for Best Male Rising Star
 2015 Edison Awards for Best Entertainer of the Year for Kaaki Sattai

Other awards
 2011 Vikatan Award – Best Anchor for Jodi No.1
 2014 Mirchi Music Awards South – Youth Icon Award
 2021 Kalaimamani Award - Best Actor

Controversies 
On 12 October 2016, at the success meet of Remo, Sivakarthikeyan revealed that, when the film was ready for release, there were quite a few obstacles created by people who wanted to ensure it didn't release. He faced a similar agony when his film Rajini Murugan saw a delayed release in January 2016. P. L. Thenappan, the general secretary of Tamil Nadu Producers Council, has told a website that K. E. Gnanavelraja of Studio Green, Madan of Escape Artists and Vendhar Movies Madhan have filed formal complaints accusing the actor of taking advance amounts to act in their films, but failing to fulfill his commitments. Gnanavel Raja has an agreement copy of their deal, while the other two do not have the same. On the other hand, Sivakarthikeyan has admitted to have taken the advance amount from Gnanavel Raja, but there is no mention of the other two. Actors Simbu and Vishal, extended support to Sivakarthikeyan about the issue. In 2022, at a school event, Sivakarthikeyan jokingly said he could not tell Korean men apart from women due all Korean people looking alike. His comments received backlash, with some accusing him of racism, and others calling it "cringe". Simran Arora of Times Now believed Sivakarthikeyan's actions were a display of the cross-race effect.

References

External links

 
 
 Sivakarthikeyan on Twitter
 

Living people
Tamil male television actors
Tamil male actors
Television personalities from Tamil Nadu
Indian stand-up comedians
Male actors in Tamil cinema
21st-century Tamil male actors
Tamil Reality dancing competition contestants
South Indian International Movie Awards winners
1985 births
Tamil film poets
Tamil playback singers
Tamil singers
Male actors in Telugu cinema